Mirosław Kowalik (born 7 May 1969 in Aleksandrów Kujawski, Poland) is a former motorcycle speedway rider from Poland, who was a member of Poland national team and rode in 2001 Speedway World Cup.

See also 
 Poland national speedway team

References

1969 births
Living people
Polish speedway riders
Polonia Bydgoszcz riders
Sportspeople from Kuyavian-Pomeranian Voivodeship